Dorothy Bramhall (1911-2004) was a British actress and former model.

Selected filmography
 Love Story (1944)
 I See a Dark Stranger (1946)
 Take My Life (1947)
 The White Unicorn (1947)
 The Clouded Crystal (1948)
 A Run for Your Money (1949)
 Encore (1951)
 Wide Boy (1952)
 Inspector Morley: Late of Scotland Yard (1952) - (TV Series) - (with Patrick Barr; Tod Slaughter; Arthur Howard; Johnny Briggs (actor))
 Murder at Scotland Yard (1953)
 To Dorothy a Son (1954)

References

External links

1911 births
2004 deaths
British film actresses